Kattangulathur railway station is one of the railway stations of the Chennai Beach–Chengalpattu section of the Chennai Suburban Railway Network. It serves the neighbourhood of Kattankulathur, a suburb of Chennai. It is situated at a distance of 45 km from Chennai Beach junction and is located on NH 32 in Kattankulathur, with an elevation of 51 m above sea level.

History
The lines at the station were electrified on 9 January 1965, with the electrification of the Tambaram—Chengalpattu section.

See also

 Chennai Suburban Railway

References

External links

Stations of Chennai Suburban Railway
Railway stations in Kanchipuram district